Gramling is a census-designated place located in Spartanburg County in the U.S. state of South Carolina. According to the 2010 United States Census, the population was 86.

History
Gramling was founded in the 1890s. A post office has been in operation at Gramling since 1892.

Geography
Gramling is located at  (35.077525, -82.134597). These coordinates place the CDP in the Northwestern part of the county, between the Town of Campobello and the City of Inman.

According to the United States Census Bureau, the CDP has a total land area of 1.004  square miles (3.599 km) and a total water area of 0.009  square miles (0.023  km).

Demographics

References

Census-designated places in Spartanburg County, South Carolina
Census-designated places in South Carolina